George Donoghue O'Brien (January 1, 1900 – October 25, 1957) was a politician from the U.S. state of Michigan who served as a member of the U.S. House of Representatives on three separate occasions.

Early life and education
O'Brien was born in Detroit, Michigan, where he attended the University of Detroit Jesuit High School. During the First World War, O'Brien served as a private and was assigned to the Students' Training Corps. He graduated from the University of Detroit in 1921 and also graduated from the University of Detroit Law School in 1924. He was admitted to the bar in 1924 and commenced practice in Detroit.

Tenure in Congress
In 1936, O'Brien defeated incumbent Republican U.S. Representative Clarence J. McLeod to be elected as a Democrat from Michigan's 13th congressional district to the 75th Congress, serving from January 3, 1937, to January 3, 1939. He lost to McLeod in 1938, but defeated McLeod again in 1940 to be elected to the 77th Congress, and subsequently re-elected to the 78th and 79th Congresses, serving from January 3, 1941, to January 3, 1947. In 1946, he lost to Republican Howard Aldridge Coffin, but defeated Coffin in 1948 to be elected to the 81st Congress and subsequently re-elected to the 82nd and 83rd Congresses, serving from January 3, 1949, to January 3, 1955. In 1954, he was defeated in the Democratic Party primary elections by Charles C. Diggs, Jr., who went on to win the general election.

O'Brien was chairman of the Committee on the Post Office and Post Roads during the 75th Congress and a delegate to the 1944 Democratic National Convention in 1944. He also was an unsuccessful candidate for circuit judge of Michigan's 3rd Circuit in 1947.

Life after Congress
After leaving Congress, O'Brien served as assistant corporation counsel of the District of Columbia, assigned to the Civil Proceedings Division from July 11, 1955, until his death in Washington, D.C.

He is interred in Mount Olivet Cemetery, Detroit, Michigan.

References

The Political Graveyard

1900 births
1957 deaths
Burials in Michigan
University of Detroit Mercy alumni
University of Detroit Jesuit High School and Academy alumni
Democratic Party members of the United States House of Representatives from Michigan
American people of Irish descent
American Roman Catholics
Lawyers from Detroit
Politicians from Detroit
20th-century American politicians